The Cossacks is a 1928 American silent drama film produced and distributed by Metro-Goldwyn-Mayer (MGM) and directed by George Hill and Clarence Brown. The film stars John Gilbert and Renée Adorée and is based on the 1863 novel The Cossacks by Leo Tolstoy.

Plot summary

Cast
 John Gilbert as Lukashka
 Renée Adorée as Maryana
 Ernest Torrence as Ivan
 Nils Asther as Prince Olenin Stieshneff
 Paul Hurst as Sitchi
 Dale Fuller as Ulitka, Maryana's mother
 Mary Alden as Lukashka's mother
 Josephine Borio as Stepka
 Yorke Sherwood as Uncle Eroshka
 Joseph Mari as Turkish Spy
 Paul Hurst as Zarka
 Sidney Bracey as Koozma, Prince Olenin's Orderly (uncredited)
 Lou Costello as Extra (uncredited)
 Charles Darvas as Extra (uncredited)
 Helena Dime as Minor Role (uncredited)
 George Goforth as Tavern Keeper (uncredited)
 Neil Neely as Secondary Role (uncredited)
 Russ Powell as Cossack (uncredited)

Production
The Cossacks was beset with problems due to MGM executives requesting various script changes during filming. Frances Marion, who wrote the screenplay, became frustrated by the numerous requests and later said she "lost track of what the story was really about and the material seemed frayed on all edges." The film's stars, John Gilbert and Renée Adorée, complained about the numerous rewrites and felt their roles were "not worthy".

Before filming completed, George W. Hill requested that he be removed as director as he did not like the film's subject matter and had tired of Gilbert and Adorée's complaints. Clarence Brown was then hired to reshoot several scenes and ultimately completed the film.

Among the many extras used in The Cossacks were members of a "Dijigit Troupe" of over 100 genuine Russian Cossacks, who in 1926 came to the United States from Europe after performing equestrian exhibitions and traditional Cossack musical and dance shows in various cities in France and England. Once the troupe arrived in the United States, MGM contracted some of its horsemen to perform as trick riders and as doubles in several of the studio's films in 1927 and 1928, including The Gaucho and The Cossacks. In its review of The Cossacks in June 1928, the American entertainment trade publication Variety notes the use of these Russian extras and their contributions to enhancing the authentic "look" of the film. Variety also comments about the equestrian exhibition, "the fiasco", that the Cossack troupe had presented in New York at Madison Square Garden before some of its performers continued to California, where MGM crews had constructed elaborate location sets for the Cossacks in Laurel Canyon:

Reception
The Cossacks received mixed reviews from critics upon its release in 1928. Variety gave generally high marks to the actors' performances and to the film's overall production values:

Mordaunt Hall, the influential film critic for The New York Times in 1928, viewed Gilbert's performance quite differently. Hall disparaged the actor's interpretation of Lukashka, both in his portrayal of the character's temperament and physical appearance:

The film earned rentals of $747,000 in the United States and Canada and foreign rentals of $588,000 for a total of $1,335,000.

References

External links
 
 
 
 
 Lobby poster
 Australian Daybill long poster

1928 films
1928 drama films
Silent American drama films
American silent feature films
American black-and-white films
Films based on Russian novels
Films directed by George Hill
Films directed by Clarence Brown
Films based on works by Leo Tolstoy
Films produced by Irving Thalberg
Metro-Goldwyn-Mayer films
Films set in the 19th century
Films set in Russia
1920s American films